Malcolm Dawes (born 3 March 1944) is a former professional English footballer born in Trimdon. He made his senior professional debut on 19 August 1970. Malcolm played professional football for Aldershot, Hartlepool, New York Cosmos, Denver Dynamos in the US, and his last club Workington.

Malcolm now performs the role of Community & Youth Development Officer for Newton Aycliffe Cricket Club and also has an active role in the Sedgefield District Cricket Development Group.

Playing career

Aldershot

Hartlepool
Malcolm made his debut for Hartlepool on 19 August 1970 against York City in the League Cup. He went on to play 213 games scoring 12 goals. Malcolm played his final game for Hartlepool against AFC Bournemouth on 16 August 1975 in the League. Malcolm was sent off only once in his career, receiving a Red Card for violent conduct for punching Stan Bowles.

New York Cosmos
Malcolm left the New York Cosmos in 1974 after playing for 2 seasons and joined the Denver Dynamos, just as Malcolm left New York Cosmos the legendary Pelé signed. Malcolm wore the number 6 shirt whilst at New York Cosmos once he had departed Franz Beckenbauer signed as his replacement took the number 6 shirt.

Denver Dynamos
Malcolm joined the Denver Dynamos from New York Cosmos in 1974 and played 19 games scoring 2 goals.

Workington AFC
Malcolm joined the reds when they were at their worst. He scored just once in 51 appearances. Malcolm joined Whitby Town when his Borough park days were over.

External links
 Malcolm Dawes (North American Soccer League Players)
 Malcolm Dawes (The Mad Crowd)
 Malcolm Dawes (Hartlepool United FC Centenary legends Dinner 15 Feb 2009)
 Malcolm Dawes (Aldershot FC stats)
 Dawes (Malcolm Dawes Workipedia)
 Malcolm Dawes (Coventry Tetelgraph)
 Malcolm Dawes (Dawes re-lives old times at Workington)

1944 births
Living people
People from Trimdon
Footballers from County Durham
English footballers
Aldershot F.C. players
Hartlepool United F.C. players
New York Cosmos players
Denver Dynamos players
Workington A.F.C. players
Association football defenders
English Football League players
North American Soccer League (1968–1984) players
English expatriate footballers
Expatriate soccer players in the United States
English expatriate sportspeople in the United States